Vincenzo Abbagnale (born 13 March 1993) is an Italian rower. He is the son of Giuseppe Abbagnale. He won the gold medal at the 2013 World Championships. He competed at the 2020 Summer Olympics.

Vincenzo Abbagnale is an athlete of the Gruppo Sportivo della Marina Militare.

See also 
 Abbagnale brothers

References

External links 
 
 Vincenzo Abbagnale at DAO

1993 births
Living people
Italian male rowers
Rowers of Marina Militare
Rowers at the 2020 Summer Olympics
World Rowing Championships medalists for Italy